Robin Christian Zacharias Larsson is a Swedish racing driver currently participating in the FIA European Rallycross Championship. He has previously won the 2014 FIA European Rallycross Supercar Championship.
He is the son of double European Rallycross Champion Lars Larsson.

Racing record

Complete FIA European Rallycross Championship results
(key)

TouringCar

Supercar

Complete FIA World Rallycross Championship results
(key)

Supercar

†  Loss of fifteen championship points – stewards' decision.

Complete Nitro Rallycross results

Supercar

Group E

References

External links

Living people
Swedish rally drivers
European Rallycross Championship drivers
World Rallycross Championship drivers
1992 births
Dreyer & Reinbold Racing drivers